Andrei Krukov (born January 7, 1971) is a former pair skater who competed internationally for both Kazakhstan and Azerbaijan. He competed through 1998 with Marina Khalturina for Kazakhstan. They placed 14th at the 1998 Winter Olympics. Following the dissolution of that partnership, he teamed up with Inga Rodionova to compete for Azerbaijan and was the 2000 Azerbaijan national champion. After retiring from competition, he began coaching in the United States. He is the coach of Luiz Manella and Isadora Williams. He currently coaches at Ashburn Ice House.

Results

With Rodionova for Azerbaijan

With Khalturina for Kazakhstan

References

External links 
 

Kazakhstani male pair skaters
Olympic figure skaters of Kazakhstan
Figure skaters at the 1998 Winter Olympics
1971 births
Azerbaijani figure skaters
Sportspeople from Karaganda
Living people
Asian Games medalists in figure skating
Figure skaters at the 1996 Asian Winter Games
Figure skaters at the 1999 Asian Winter Games
Asian Games silver medalists for Kazakhstan
Medalists at the 1996 Asian Winter Games
Medalists at the 1999 Asian Winter Games
Universiade medalists in figure skating
Universiade gold medalists for Kazakhstan
Competitors at the 1995 Winter Universiade
Competitors at the 1997 Winter Universiade